Alfred Almont (born 15 September 1944 in Schœlcher, Martinique) is a member of the National Assembly of France as a representative of the island of Martinique. A member of the French Radical Party, Almont works in association with the Union for a Popular Movement.

References

1944 births
Living people
People from Schœlcher
Martiniquais politicians
Radical Party (France) politicians
Mayors of places in Martinique
Union for a Popular Movement politicians
Deputies of the 12th National Assembly of the French Fifth Republic
Deputies of the 13th National Assembly of the French Fifth Republic